Liri Berisha (born 5 July 1948) is an Albanian pediatrician and president of the Albanian Children Foundation, and also a UNICEF ambassador.

She is the wife of Sali Berisha, the former President and Prime Minister of Albania, with whom she has two children, daughter Argita and son Shkëlzen.

Early life and career
Liri Berisha was born Slobodanka Ramaj. She is the daughter of Rexhep Ramaj Balidemaj, an ethnic Albanian from Martinovići near Plav, at the time part of Yugoslavia (now Montenegro), and Milica Bulatović, a Montenegrin woman. After the Yugoslav–Albanian split in 1948, her name was changed by the government to Liri Ramaj.

In 2008, Berisha founded the Mother Teresa Cultural Foundation. In 2009, the Women's Information Network named Berisha "Woman of the Year".

Berisha joined Autism Speaks in 2011 in celebrating the opening of a new centre for autistic children in Albania, calling the centre a way to improve the lives of children with autism there.

References

External links

Liri Berisha talking at TED

1948 births
Albanian people of Montenegrin descent
Albanian pediatricians
Autism activists
First ladies of Albania
Living people
Women pediatricians
UNICEF Goodwill Ambassadors
Albanian health activists